The Munster Football League was a senior inter-county Gaelic football competition. It was established in 1925. The competition was often referred to as the McGrath Cup, as the trophy was presented by Mr. Pat McGrath, the secretary of the Munster Council.

This competition is not to be confused with the McGrath Cup which commenced in 1981 to stem the decline of Gaelic football in Munster and continues to take place at the start of each season.

Roll of honour

References

1
Defunct Gaelic football competitions
Gaelic football leagues in Ireland